The Land Transfer Act 1875 (38 & 39 Vict c 87), sometimes called Lord Cairns' Act, was an Act of the Parliament of the United Kingdom that introduced a voluntary system of registration of title to land.

The Act apparently aimed to introduce the Australian model of title registration. But land registration remained as voluntary, and the options were not taken up.

See also
English land law

References
Holt, Edward H. The Land Transfer Act, 1875 (38 & 39 Vict. Cap. 87). Shaw & Sons. Fetter Lane & Crane Court, London. 1876. Google Books.
William Thomas Charley. The Real Property Acts, 1874, 1875 & 1876. Third Edition. H Sweet. Chancery Lane, London. 1876. Chapter 5 ("1875 V. Land Titles and Transfer"). Pages 111 to 352 (including "Appendix to the Land Transfer Act, 1875" at page 299 et seq.).
William Henry Barlow Atkinson. A Sketch of the Land Transfer Act, 1875, and the Land Transfer Bill, 1887. Stevens and Sons. London. 1888. Reviewed at (1888) 84 The Law Times 299 (25 February).
Charles Fortescue Bricksdale and William Robert Sheldon. The Land Transfer Acts, 1875 and 1897. Stevens and Sons Limited. Chancery Lane, London. 1899. Internet Archive:  .
Benjamin Lennard Cherry and Harold Walter Marogold. The Land Transfer Acts 1875 & 1897. Sweet and Maxwell Limited. Chancery Lane, London. 1899. Internet Archive.
Richard Halliday. A Concise Treatise on the Law and Practice of Conveyancing. Second Edition. Horace Cox. Windsor House, Bream's Buildings. London. 1900. Chapter 14 ("The Land Transfer Acts 1875 and 1897, and Rules and Orders issued thereon for the Registration of Title to Land"). Pages 611 to 693. Internet Archive.

English property law
Housing legislation in the United Kingdom
United Kingdom Acts of Parliament 1875
Land registration